Malcolm Dalrymple (2 December 1922 – 17 November 2008) was a British athlete. He competed in the men's javelin throw at the 1948 Summer Olympics.

References

1922 births
2008 deaths
Athletes (track and field) at the 1948 Summer Olympics
British male javelin throwers
Olympic athletes of Great Britain
Sportspeople from Bedford